WNGE (99.5 FM, "99.5 K-Rock") is a radio station licensed to Negaunee, Michigan, broadcasting an active rock format. The station first went on the air in July 2001.

In July 2020, WNGE changed their format from classic hits to active rock, branded as "99.5 K-Rock". The format moved from sister station WUPK 94.1 FM, which switched to soft adult contemporary as "The Breeze."

Previous logo

References

Sources
Michiguide.com - WNGE History

External links

NGE
Radio stations established in 2001
Active rock radio stations in the United States